The Tempisque River, or Río Tempisque, is  long, located entirely in Costa Rica flowing from the Guanacaste Cordillera near the Orosí Volcano and emptying into the Gulf of Nicoya. It passes through the Palo Verde National Park and is an important habitat for various species of crocodiles, monkeys, iguanas and birds.

The river is heavily silted, limiting navigation to shallow crafts that can cross the muddy flats. Tidal conditions dictate the timing to cross the bar at the river mouth.

Historically the Tempisque was used to float logs down to the sea. The logs were gathered at Chira Island to be loaded on ships.

The Tempisque River Bridge was built linking the Nicoya Peninsula to southern Guanacaste and hence significantly cut travel time to San José. It was funded by a gift from the Taiwanese government, and opened in November 2002.

References

Rivers of Costa Rica
Geography of Guanacaste Province